Nanpa is a type of flirting in Japan.

NANPA is the North American Numbering Plan Administration, the organization responsible for assigning telephone area codes in most of North America.

Nanpa or NANPA may also refer to:

 Dōkyūsei (video game series) aka Nanpa, a dating simulation game
 North American Nature Photography Association

See also 
 Nampa (disambiguation)